Peptide methionine sulfoxide reductase (Msr) is a family of enzymes that in humans is encoded by the MSRA gene.

Function 

Msr is ubiquitous and highly conserved. Human and animal studies have shown the highest levels of expression in kidney and liver.  It carries out the enzymatic reduction of methionine sulfoxide (MetO), the oxidized form of the amino acid methionine (Met), back to methionine, using thioredoxin to catalyze the enzymatic reduction and repair of oxidized methionine residues. Its proposed function is thus the repair of oxidative damage to proteins to restore biological activity. Oxidation of methionine residues in tissue proteins can cause them to misfold or otherwise render them dysfunctional.

Clinical significance 

MetO increases with age in body tissues, which is believed by some to contribute to biological ageing. Moreover, levels of methionine sulfoxide reductase A (MsrA) decline in aging tissues in mice and in association with age-related disease in humans. There is thus a rationale for thinking that by maintaining the structureincreased levels or activity of MsrA might retard the rate of aging.

Indeed, transgenic Drosophila (fruit flies) that overexpress methionine sulfoxide reductase show extended lifespan. However, the effects of MsrA overexpression in mice were ambiguous. MsrA is found in both the cytosol and the energy-producing mitochondria, where most of the body's endogenous free radicals are produced. Transgenically increasing the levels of MsrA in either the cytosol or the mitochondria had no significant effect on lifespan assessed by most standard statistical tests, and may possibly have led to early deaths in the cytosol-specific mice, although the survival curves appeared to suggest a slight increase in maximum (90%) survivorship, as did analysis using Boschloo's test, a binomial test designed to test greater extreme variation.

Deletion of this gene has been associated with insulin resistance in mice, while overexpression reduces insulin resistance in old mice.

See also
 MSRB2
 Methionine oxidation
 SEPX1

References

Further reading